The Australian Film Institute Jury Prize is an award in the annual Australian Film Institute Awards. It was awarded annually between 1976 and 1984.

Previous winners
1976: Fred Schepisi (The Devil's Playground)
1977: Matt Carroll (Storm Boy)
1978: John Duigan (Mouth to Mouth)
1979: George Miller, Byron Kennedy (Mad Max)
1980: Don McLennan (Hard Knocks)
1981: Ned Lander, Graeme Isaac (Wrong Side of the Road)
1982: Peter Tammer (Journey to the End of the Night)
1983: Peter Weir, Linda Hunt (The Year of Living Dangerously)
1984: Roger Savage

References

Australian Film Institute Awards